Habibi Yah Habibi is a well-known zemer of Asher Mizrahi, composed by Rahamim Omar.

The zemer has gained especial popularity among Mizrahi Jews, now traditionally sung at religious occasions. In particular, it is sung during three pilgrimage festivals (Pesach, Shavuot, Succot) due to the closing line "וְאָז יֵרָאֶה כָּל זְכוּרֶךָ שָׁלֹשׁ פְּעָמִים בַּשָּׁנָה" ("Then all your males shall make pilgrimage three times each year"—a paraphrase of a biblical quotation).

Lyrics (Hebrew) 
"חֲבִיבִי יָהּ חֲבִיבִי
הָאֵל הַמֶּלֶך הָרַחֲמָן
יִשְׁלַח מְשִׁיחוֹ הַנֶּאְמָן

אָב הָרַחֲמָן שְׁמַע קוֹלֵנוּ שְׁלַח בֶּן דָּוִד וְיִגְאֲלֵנוּ
נָשׁוּב לְצִיּוֹן עִיר קָדְשֵׁנוּ וְנִשְׁלֹט בָּהּ בְּיָד רָמָה

שָׁמָּה נִתְאַסֵּף בְּעִיר הַבִּירָה וּמֵחָדָשׁ יִשָּׁמַע קוֹל שִׁירָה
וְאָז נַדְלִיק אֶת הַמְּנוֹרָה בְּבֵית שׁוֹכֵן מְעוֹנָה

רְאֵה בָּעֳנִי יִשְׂרָאֵל עַמֶּךָ וְהָשִׁיבֵם נָא לִגְבוּלָךָ
וְאָז יֵרָאֶה כָּל זְכוּרֶךָ שָׁלֹשׁ פְּעָמִים בַּשָּׁנָה"

See also

Habibi (disambiguation)

External links 
 

Hebrew-language songs